Sunnambu Canal is a water stream canal that runs in the northern part of Erode city in India. It was once a celebrated natural channel which supplied water for irrigation of lands in the surrounding areas it runs through. Being one of the minor tributaries to River Kaveri, the canal gets sourced by rain through smaller rivulets and the seepage from LBP Canal.

It starts near Chithode and ends its travel by inflowing into River Kaveri near RN Pudur. It runs for a length of  through the areas of Sottaiyampalayam and Suriyampalayam.

Environmental Issues
In the recent days, a number of Tanneries, dyeing units, textile mills and bleaching units has been established in this zone of Erode Municipal Corporation. The higher industrialization rate in this zone has caused adverse effects to this canal. It faces a lot of hazards and the water turns purple often due to the mix of untreated effluents that gets released into them from the nearby tanneries, dyeing and bleaching units. The Government along with some other civic agencies has taken several measures to control pollution in this canal, by implement some biological and mechanical treatment methodologies with aid from Norway-based companies.

See also
 Perumpallam Canal
 Pichaikaranpallam Canal
 Nanjai Uthukuli Canal

References

Erode district
Canals in Tamil Nadu